Eren Keles (born 13 May 1994) is a professional footballer who plays for Floridsdorfer AC. Born in Austria and as his parents are from Turkey, Eren Keles remains eligible to represent either Austria or Turkey on international level.

Career
Keles joined Floridsdorfer AC on 10 July 2022, after having played in Turkey for four years.

Career statistics

References

External links
Profile at SK Rapid Wien Official Website 

1994 births
Living people
Austrian people of Turkish descent
Austrian footballers
Association football midfielders
Austrian Football Bundesliga players
2. Liga (Austria) players
TFF First League players
TFF Second League players
First Vienna FC players
SK Rapid Wien players
SKN St. Pölten players
Adanaspor footballers
Ankaraspor footballers
Tarsus Idman Yurdu footballers